Israel was present at the 1983 Eurovision Song Contest, which was held in Munich, Germany. Their entry was "Hi"(Chai) Alive, written by Ehud Manor, composed by the previous year's Israeli representative Avi Toledano, and performed by Ofra Haza. The song was selected through Israel's traditional national final, the Kdam Eurovision.

Before Eurovision

Kdam Eurovision 1983 
Israel's national final was held on 5 March 1983 at the Jerusalem Theatre and was co-hosted by Daniel Pe'er (who also co-hosted the 1979 international final in Jerusalem) and Dalia Mazor. One of the competitors was Pe'er's 1979 co-host Yardena Arazi, who also competed as a member of Chocolate, Menta, Mastik in the 1976 contest. Arazi finished second, as she had in the previous year's national selection, and would later claim that the votes were incorrectly tallied and she, not Haza, had actually earned the ticket to Munich. However, she did not want to appear to be a sore loser, and let Haza take the victory. Arazi would later compete once again in the following Kdam in 1985 (as Israel sat the 1984 contest out due to coinciding with Yom HaZikaron), finishing third, co-hosted the 1987 Kdam, and would eventually be internally selected by the IBA in 1988, performing all the songs in the Kdam (including the eventual entry "Ben Adam"). The winner was chosen through several regional juries.

At Eurovision 
Both Ofra Haza and conductor Nansi Silviu Brandes remarked that competing in Munich held a special significance to the Israeli delegation. 1983 marked eleven years from the Munich Olympic Massacre, which saw the murder of several Israeli Olympic athletes. Additionally, following a somber visit to the Dachau concentration camp, Haza noted what significance there would be to an Israeli song winning in Germany, particularly one with a message of "all of Israel [being] alive." British commentator Terry Wogan remarked prior to their performance that the song and Haza's vocals had been well-received in rehearsals, and that Israel were now considered "a sleeper" to potentially win the contest. 

Israel performed sixteenth on the night of the contest, following Denmark and preceding Portugal. Unlike the previous year, in which Avi Toledano's "Hora" coming second was still a fair distance behind winner Germany, "Hi" was in contention through most of the voting, with two countries (Austria and the Netherlands) awarding Israel a maximum 12 points. Indeed, nine countries had Israel in their top three (including ten points from Belgium, host country Germany, eventual winner Luxembourg, Portugal, the United Kingdom, and Yugoslavia; and eight points from France), all but two rated them five points or higher (Greece and Italy, who each awarded three points), and only two more (Cyprus and Turkey) failed to award Israel any points at all. Nevertheless, this proved to make all the difference, as by the end of the voting it left Israel six points adrift of winning the contest. 

It was the second consecutive silver finish for Israel, and, as was the case the year before, the Israeli jury awarded twelve points to the winning song, in this case Luxembourg's Corinne Hermes with "Si la vie est cadeau".

Voting

After Eurovision 
Ofra Haza went on to have a successful international career following her Eurovision participation. 1984 saw the release of her album Yemenite Songs, a collection of Yemeni Jewish songs and poems recalling Haza's heritage. It included her version of Rabbi Shalom Shabazi's poem "Im Nin'alu", which was remixed by Izhar Ashdot in 1987 and became a major hit in Europe the year after. Her international debut album, Shaday (1988), wound up selling over a million copies worldwide. 

Her 1992 album Kirya became the first Israeli album to be nominated for a Grammy, and in 1994 she performed at the Nobel Peace Prize Concert, an achievement she shares with a handful of fellow Eurovision contestants, including Secret Garden, Jan Werner Danielsen, Alexander Rybak, Il Volo, and Wenche Myhre. She provided the voice of Yocheved in 1998's The Prince of Egypt for eighteen different international versions. She died in 2000 of AIDS-related pneumonia, but remains an influential and highly popular figure in Israel to this day.

As stated above, Israel withdrew from the 1984 contest due to it coinciding with Yom HaZikaron. There have been persistent rumors that the song "Balalaika" by Ilanit was intended to represent Israel in Luxembourg, but the songwriters have stated it was never written with Eurovision in mind and there is no version of the song that meets the three-minute time limit of a Eurovision entry. "Hi" was therefore succeeded as the Israeli entry by Izhar Cohen's "Olé, Olé" in 1985.

References 

1983
Countries in the Eurovision Song Contest 1983
Eurovision